Alison Van Uytvanck was the defending champion, but chose not to participate.

Pauline Parmentier won the title defeating Jessica Pegula in the final 7–5, 6–2.

Seeds

Draw

Finals

Top half

Bottom half

Qualifying

Seeds

Qualifiers

Qualifying draw

First qualifier

Second qualifier

Third qualifier

Fourth qualifier

Fifth qualifier

Sixth qualifier

References
Main Draw
Qualifying Draw

Coupe Banque Nationale - Singles
2018 Singles
Can